The Mongolian Military Museum also known as the Museum of the Mongolian Armed Forces, is located in northern Ulaanbaatar, Mongolia. It explains Mongolian military history dating back to the Mongol Empire. It is currently located across from an army barracks. The museum is part of the Ministry of Defense.

History
The concept of an all-Mongolian museum of military history was initially proposed by Minister of Military Affairs Marshal Gelegdorjiin Demid (1932-1937), but the museum was not established until years later. On 21 January 1966, The Mongolian People's Revolutionary Party's Central Committee held a meeting to establish The Mongolian Army Museum. The relevant document on its establishment (decree №2)  is itself situated in the modern museum. After over 20 years of research, the museum's groundbreaking ceremony took place on 24 October 1987 in the presence of General Secretary Jambyn Batmönkh, Defence Minister Jamsrangijn Jondon and other party officials. The museum building held its opening ceremony on 15 March 1996 after which it received its first visitors.

Marshal of the Soviet Union Georgy Zhukov's summer home in Mongolia during the Battles of Khalkhin Gol was an historical building in the capital and independent of the Ministry of Defense prior to 1990 when it was transferred to the Mongolian Military Museum that year.

Exhibits

The museum currently contains 8,000 historical Mongolian army-related possessions. Two halls contain more than 3,000 exhibits specifically related to the structure of the armed forces and interventions made by Mongolia military personnel, including a display from the Mongolian Expeditionary Task Force in Operation Enduring Freedom, its display featuring rocket shrapnel that landed on a Mongolian compound at Al Diwaniyah. The museum also has two rare Russian Mosin–Nagant bolt-action, internal magazine–fed, military sniper rifles in its inventory. Throughout the exhibition halls, military artifacts spanning hundreds of years are displayed, from weapons and military tactics of the Mongol Empire to the Soviet-style uniforms of the Mongolian People's Army.

See also
Zaisan Memorial
Sükhbaatar's Mausoleum
List of museums in Mongolia
National Museum of Mongolia

References

Military history of Mongolia
Museums established in 1966
Museums in Mongolia
Monuments and memorials in Mongolia
Buildings and structures in Ulaanbaatar
Military of Mongolia
Army museums in Asia